The New Man may refer to:

 The New Man (film), 2007 Swedish film
 The New Man (Upstairs, Downstairs), episode of the British television series Upstairs, Downstairs
 , a sculpture by German artist Otto Freundlich

See also
New man (disambiguation)